Linley Margaret Frame (born 12 November 1971), is an Australian competitive swimmer who won a gold medal in the 100-metre breaststroke at the 1991 FINA World Aquatics Championships, and represented Australia at the 1992 Summer Olympics in Barcelona, coming in 15th and 19th in her breaststroke events.

At the Australian Institute of Sport (AIS) she was coached by Terry Gathercole. She was named AIS Athlete of the Year in 1991.

In 1996, Frame retired from swimming after developing chronic fatigue syndrome.

Frame was a poolside interviewer for Channel Seven at the 1996 Summer Olympics in Atlanta, 2000 Summer Olympics in Sydney, and was a studio pundit for the 2004 Summer Olympics in Athens. 

In 2009, Frame made a comeback to swimming. Competing at the 2009 World Masters Games, she won a gold medal in the W35-39 50m breaststroke event, beating the second-place swimmer by more than 3 seconds. Frame now holds FINA Masters World Records for the W40-44 age group in 50m breaststroke and 100m breaststroke events. She competed at the 2014 FINA World Masters Championships in Montreal, and won gold medals in the W40-44 50m, 100m and 200m breaststroke events.

, Frame works at Swimming Victoria as Athlete and Coach Liaison Officer. Since 2001, she has been an ambassador for Red Dust Role Models, a charity that visits remote Aboriginal communities throughout the Northern Territory and Western Australia, teaching children the importance of a healthy lifestyle and good education.

Philanthropy  
Frame is a distinguished ambassador of The Fred Hollows Foundation in which she helps raise awareness for this international non-profit organization. The Fred Hollows Foundation educates surgeons on how to cure avoidable blindness within underserved communities and countries. Specifically, they work within the Aboriginal and Torres Strait Islander communities of Indigenous Australia.

References

External links
 Linley Frame at Red Dust Role Models

1971 births
Living people
Sportswomen from Victoria (Australia)
Olympic swimmers of Australia
Swimmers at the 1992 Summer Olympics
World Aquatics Championships medalists in swimming
Australian Institute of Sport swimmers
Medalists at the FINA World Swimming Championships (25 m)
People with chronic fatigue syndrome
Australian female breaststroke swimmers
Swimmers from Melbourne
20th-century Australian women
21st-century Australian women